Ocampo is a city and seat of the municipality of Ocampo, in the north-eastern Mexican state of Coahuila. It had a population of 3,679 inhabitants in the 2010 census, representing over one-third of the municipality's population.

References

Populated places in Coahuila